The Museum is the first greatest hits album by Japanese singer Nana Mizuki, released on 7 February 2007. The album peaked at number 5 in the Oricon weekly charts.

Track listing
 (1st single)
Lyrics: Chokkyu Murano
Arrangement: Nobuhiro Makino
Insert song for Drama CD 
Heaven Knows (2nd single)
Lyrics: Chokkyu Murano
Arrangement: Nobuhiro Makino
Ending theme for anime television series Run=Dim
The Place of Happiness (3rd single)
Lyrics: Chokkyu Murano
Arrangement: Nobuhiro Makino
Theme song for PS2 game Generation of Chaos
Love & History (4th single)
Lyrics: Chokkyu Murano
Arrangement: Nobuhiro Makino
Theme song for PS2 game Generation of Chaos NEXT
Power Gate (5th single)
Lyrics, composition, arrangement: Toshiro Yabuki
Ending theme for TV Osaka's program M-Voice
Suddenly: Meguriaete (6th single)
Lyrics, composition, arrangement: Toshiro Yabuki
New Sensation (7th single)
Lyrics, composition, arrangement: Toshiro Yabuki
Theme song for Ozaki TV commercial
still in the groove (8th single)
Lyrics, composition, arrangement: Toshiro Yabuki
Theme song for TV commercial dwango's Iro melo mix
Panorama (9th single)
Lyrics: Nana Mizuki
Composition: Akimitsu Honma
Arrangement: Akimitsu Honma, Toshiro Yabuki
Opening theme for PS2 game Lost Aya Sophia
innocent starter (10th single)
Lyrics: Nana Mizuki
Composition, arrangement: Tsutomu Ohira
 Opening theme for anime television series Magical Girl Lyrical Nanoha
Wild Eyes (11th single)
Lyrics: Nana Mizuki
Composition, arrangement: Takahiro Iida
Ending theme for anime television series Basilisk: The Kouga Ninja Scroll
Eternal Blaze (12th single)
Lyrics: Nana Mizuki
Composition, arrangement: Noriyasu Agematsu (Elements Garden)
Opening theme for anime television series Magical Girl Lyrical Nanoha A's
Super Generation (13th single)
Lyrics: Nana Mizuki
Composition, arrangement: Junpei Fujita (Elements Garden)
Ending theme for TV Asahi program Yaguchi Hitori
Justice to Believe (Museum Style) (14th single)
Lyrics: Nana Mizuki
Composition, arrangement: Noriyasu Agematsu (Elements Garden)
The original version is the opening theme of the PS2 game Wild Arms 5
Crystal Letter
Lyrics: Hibiki
Composition: Matsuki Fuji
Arrangement: Hitoshi Fujima (Elements Garden)
Ending theme for PS2 game Wild Arms 5
New song made for this album
Transmigration 2007
Lyrics: Masami Okui
Composition, arrangement: Toshiro Yabuki
New rendition of the original "Transmigration"

The Museum DVD
Promo Video for Crystal Letter
Studio Live for Tears' Night
Studio Live for 
Studio Live for Justice to Believe
The Museum photo shooting

Charts

External links
  

2007 greatest hits albums
Nana Mizuki albums
2007 video albums